Augustaea is a monotypic genus of ant-like Singaporean jumping spiders containing the single species, Augustaea formicaria. It was first described by C. Szombathy in 1915, and is only found in Singapore.

Szombathy's drawings suggest that A. formicaria might belong to Orsima, but no study has been published on it since its first description in 1915.

References

Monotypic Salticidae genera
Salticidae
Spiders of Asia